Ecsenius yaeyamaensis, known commonly as the Yaeyama blenny in Guam and Micronesia, and also known as the Yaeyama clown blenny in Micronesia, or the Pale-spotted combtooth-blenny in Indonesia is a species of combtooth blenny in the genus Ecsenius. It is found in coral reefs in the western Pacific and Indian oceans. It can reach a maximum length of 6 centimetres. Blennies in this species feed primarily off of plants, including benthic algae and weeds, and are commercial aquarium fish.

References
 Aoyagi, H. 1954 [ref. 130] Description of one new genus and three new species of Blenniidae from the Riu-Kiu Islands. Dobutsugaku Zasshi = Zoological Magazine Tokyo v. 63 (no. 5): 213–217.

External links
 

yaeyamaensis
Fish described in 1954